John Aldag (born 1963) is a Canadian Liberal politician, who represents the riding of Cloverdale—Langley City in the House of Commons of Canada. He was first elected in the 2015 federal election, and served until his defeat in the 2019 Canadian federal election. In the 2021 federal election he won his seat back over incumbent Conservative Tamara Jansen.

Early life and career
Aldag was born in rural Saskatchewan. He earned an MBA from Royal Roads University and had a 32-year career with Parks Canada, including postings in Whitehorse, Lake Louise, Yoho, Waterloo and Langley, where he was the administrator of Fort Langley National Historic Site before his entry into politics. Aldag took an unpaid leave from Parks Canada in December 2013 to begin campaigning for election to office, which he ultimately won with nearly 46% of the vote. He resigned his position upon being confirmed as the elected candidate by Elections Canada on October 26, 2015.

Aldag and his wife, Elaine St. John, a doctor, have two daughters and one son, and had lived in Langley for a decade at the time of his election to the House of Commons.

Politics
Aldag was elected in the 2015 election as a Member of Parliament for Cloverdale—Langley City. In the 42nd Canadian Parliament, he was appointed to two parliamentary committees; the Environment and Sustainable Development committee and the Special Joint Committee on Physician-Assisted Dying, an issue in which he consulted extensively with his constituents. The issue of Physician-Assisted Dying touched him, causing him to be a proponent of families having conversations about their wishes in these situations.  He was later named as well to the House of Commons Special Committee on Electoral Reform. Aldag introduced Private Member's Bill C-374 which, if adopted, would provide a seat on the Historic Sites and Monuments Board of Canada for First Nations, Inuit and Métis representation.

Electoral record

References

External links

Living people
Liberal Party of Canada MPs
Members of the House of Commons of Canada from British Columbia
Year of birth uncertain
People from Langley, British Columbia (city)
21st-century Canadian politicians
1963 births